Roos Zwetsloot (born 27 July 2000) is a Dutch skateboarder. She competed in the women's street event at the 2020 Summer Olympics and finished in 5th place.

2020 Olympics 
At the Tokyo 2020 Olympics, Zwetsloot was one of 20 athletes that competed for the women's street skateboarding event. Zwetsloot qualified by being ranked 7th by Olympic World Skateboarding Rankings. In the semifinals, Zwetsloot came in 4th place, advancing to the finals round. In the finals, Zwetsloot performed well in the open runs, putting her in first place going into the single trick section. However, in the trick section, Zwetsloot landed only 1 of her 5 trick attempts, dropping her to 5th place in the final result.

Major results

2021 
3rd Women's Street Final at the 2021 Dew Tour
5th Skateboarding at the 2020 Summer Olympics – Women's street

References 

2000 births
Living people
Dutch skateboarders
Female skateboarders
Olympic skateboarders of the Netherlands
Skateboarders at the 2020 Summer Olympics
Sportspeople from Utrecht (city)